The Gallopin' Gaucho is the second short film featuring Mickey Mouse to be produced, following Plane Crazy and preceding Steamboat Willie. The Disney studios completed the silent version in August 1928, but did not release it in order to work on Steamboat Willie. It was released, with sound, after Steamboat Willie.

Both Mickey and Minnie Mouse had already made their initial debuts with the test screening of Plane Crazy on May 15, 1928. However that film had also failed to catch the attention of distributors when first produced as a silent film. The Gallopin' Gaucho was a second attempt at success by co-directors Walt Disney and Ub Iwerks. The latter also served as the sole animator for it.

As the title implies, the short was intended as a parody of Douglas Fairbanks's The Gaucho, a film first released on November 21, 1927. Following the original film, the events of the short take place in the Pampas of Argentina with Mickey cast as the gaucho of the title.

Plot
Mickey is introduced riding on a rhea. He soon reaches local bar and restaurant Cantina Argentina. He enters the establishment with the apparent intent to relax with some drinking and smoking. (On the wall, a wanted sign for Mickey saying El gaucho, meaning Mickey Mouse is a bandit or a crook.)

Already present are resident barmaid and dancer Minnie Mouse and a fellow customer. The latter is Black Pete and is soon introduced as a wanted outlaw. Pete had already been established as an antagonist in both the Alice Comedies and the Oswald the Lucky Rabbit series.  However, this short marks his first encounter with either Mickey or Minnie.  The latter pair also appears unfamiliar to each other. The short apparently depicts their initial encounter.

Minnie performs the tango and salsa, and both customers start flirting with her. Pete then attempts to put an early ending to their emerging rivalry by proceeding in kidnapping her. He escapes on his donkey while Mickey gives chase on his rhea and soon catches up to his rival. Pete and Mickey then proceed in challenging each other to a sword duel. The latter emerges the victor (by covering Pete's head with a chamber pot he pulls out from under a bed) and finally gets hold of Minnie. The finale has Mickey and Minnie riding the rhea stage left until they are obscured entirely by trees in the foreground.

Characters
In later interviews, Iwerks would comment that Mickey as featured in The Gallopin' Gaucho was intended to be a swashbuckler, an adventurer modeled after Fairbanks himself. Later audiences would comment on all three earlier versions of Mickey Mouse characters as seeming to come out of rough, lower class backgrounds that little resemble the later versions of Mickey Mouse.

The feature characters of The Gallopin' Gaucho were obscure. When the cartoon starts, Mickey and Minnie have the same eyes as they have in Plane Crazy, but once Black Pete appears they suddenly have the dot eyes from Steamboat Willie. Mickey was at first thought to be much too similar to Oswald the Rabbit, which may have helped to explain the audience's apparent lack of interest in him. The mostly adult audience had become bored with what came to be called "rubber hose" animation. Disney would soon start to contemplate ways to distinguish the Mickey Mouse series from his previous work and that of his rivals.  Minnie's role as performer and damsel in distress is solidified in this.  It is also the first time she wears her distinctive oversized high-heeled pumps, although they fall off when she is kidnapped, and she spends the rest of the cartoon shoeless.  Mickey is also seen wearing shoes for the first time, and as the years went by, animators would change Mickey Mouse.  In the first three Mickey Mouse shorts, he is a character meant to appeal to adult sensibilities; he smokes, drinks, and cavorts.  Soon after Walt and his animators revised their star (for the first, but not for the last time), after which Mickey Mouse became the "wholesome" character designed to appeal to children and to please the parent.

Receptions
The Film Daily (January 6, 1929) said: "This features Mickey Mouse, the demon hero who has his ups and downs trying to rescue his sweetie who has been kidnapped by the villain Cat. In this one he takes a regular Doug Fairbanks part as a hard riding gaucho of the South American pampas. It is good burlesquing all the way, and the cartoon work of Walt Disney is clever in the extreme. It has some neat comedy effects through the addition of sound, which make the film far more enjoyable and laughable than it could possibly be in silent form."

Variety (January 9, 1929) said: "Good six minutes for the big programs because the animated drawings do some giggle getting stuff. This is Walt Disney penmanship, programmed as introducing a new cartoon character, 'Mickey Mouse', with Powers having synchronized via Cinephone. Sound effects won some laughs here on their own, but after it's all over the impression remains that any alert pit drummer can duplicate... Value in this one comes from the antics Disney makes his figures perform during a chase and a duel. Familiar enough as a plot, but some new wrinkles in body gymnastics and the fantastic means to gain numerous ends. Audience liked it and although enhanced by the effects the reel is strong enough to stand in the A houses plus just an organ or orchestra. If the musicians are smart enough to keep pace with it so much the better. An unusual cartoon in being good with or without sound."

Home media
The short was released on December 2, 2002 on Walt Disney Treasures: Mickey Mouse in Black and White.

See also
Mickey Mouse (film series)

References

External links
 
 
 
 The Gallopin' Gaucho at The Encyclopedia of Disney Animated Shorts

1920s Disney animated short films
1928 films
1928 animated films
1928 comedy films
American black-and-white films
Mickey Mouse short films
Films directed by Ub Iwerks
Films produced by Walt Disney
Films scored by Carl Stalling
Animated films without speech
Films about gauchos
Films set in Argentina
1920s American films